Furioso II (1965–1986) is one of the most influential sires in sport horse history. His offspring have performed well in all disciplines of show jumping, including at the Barcelona and Sydney Olympics.

History

Furioso II was imported in 1968 to Germany by George Vorwerk, a breeder of Oldenburg horses. His dam, Dame de Renville, produced several great horses, including Mexico, Laeken, Jexico de Parc and Heur de Bratand.

The stallion was approved for the Oldenburg stud book in 1967, and won his 100-day test performed in 1968 at Westercelle. He was incredibly influential to the Oldenburg breed, which used his Thoroughbred bloodlines through his sire to introduce a more modern type of sport horse without resorting to a pure Thoroughbred. Known as the "Stamp Stallion", because his offspring inherited his 'very good feet and legs, his outstanding neck and shoulder, striking dappled chocolate chestnut coat with flaxen tail and white markings', Furioso II was later approved for the Hanoverian, Rhineland, and Westphalian studbooks.

Based on money earned by offspring, Furioso II was the top producing stallion in Germany from 1979 to 1989. In 1990 he was the top producer of dressage horses. During his lifetime, the stallion produced over 200 state premium mares and at least 70 approved sons, including:
 Mexico: sire of 20 approved sons, 20 dams of stallions, and numerous show jumping horses
 FBI: show jumper
 Heisman: finished fourth at the Barcelona Olympic in show jumping, was Horse of the Year in the United States
 For Pleasure: won show jumping team gold at both the Atlanta and Sydney Olympics, has sired 8 licensed Hanoverian stallions to date, was German Horse of the Year in 1995 and 1996
 Voltaire: show jumping sire of 33 approved sons, including Finesse and Altaire
 Cocktail: Grand Prix dressage horse ridden by Anky van Grunsven, sire of Jazz
 He is also seen in the lines, through his grandson Welt As, of Bonfire and STC Diamond

Furioso II died in 1986, due to colic.

See also
Precipitation (horse)
Furioso
Cor de la Bryere
Popeye K
Royal Kaliber
Valegro

External links
Horse Magazine
Pedigree chart
Dressage.to – collection of links about Furioso II

Show jumping horses
Dressage horses
Sport horse sires
Individual warmbloods
1965 animal births
1986 animal deaths
Individual male horses